The 2016–17 Baylor Bears basketball team represented Baylor University in the 2016–17 NCAA Division I men's basketball season. This was head coach Scott Drew's 14th season at Baylor. The Bears competed in the Big 12 Conference and played their home games at the Ferrell Center in Waco, TX. They finished the season 27–8, 12–6 in Big 12 play to finish in a three-way tie for second place. They lost to Kansas State in the quarterfinals of the Big 12 tournament. They received an at-large bid to the NCAA tournament where they defeated New Mexico State and USC before losing in the Sweet Sixteen to South Carolina.

Previous season
The Bears finished the 2015–16 season 22–12, 10–8 in Big 12 play to finish in a tie for fifth place. They defeated Texas in the quarterfinals of the Big 12 tournament to advance to the semifinals where they lost to Kansas. They received an at-large bid to the NCAA tournament as a No. 5 seed and lost in the first round to No. 12-seeded Yale.

Departures

Incoming transfers

Recruits

Roster

Schedule and results

|-
!colspan=9 style="background:#; color:#;"|Regular season

|-
! colspan=9 style="background:#;"| Big 12 tournament

|-
! colspan=9 style="background:#;"| NCAA tournament

Rankings

*AP does not release post-NCAA tournament rankings

References

Baylor
Baylor Bears men's basketball seasons
Baylor